Ixora chinensis, commonly known as Chinese ixora, is a species of plant of the genus Ixora.

Synonyms
The Catalogue of Life regonises the following synonyms:

References

https://biofertilize.com/ixora-chinensis/

External links

chinensis